Mariël Borgerink (born 28 March 1992) is a Dutch professional racing cyclist. She rides for the Lensworld.eu-Zannata team.

See also
 List of 2015 UCI Women's Teams and riders

References

External links

1992 births
Living people
Dutch female cyclists
People from Oldenzaal
Cyclists from Overijssel